Platyptilia superscandens is a moth of the family Pterophoridae. It was described by Thomas Bainbrigge Fletcher in 1940 and it is found in India.

References

Moths described in 1940
superscandens
Endemic fauna of India
Moths of Asia